Pod Save the People is an American political podcast produced and distributed by Crooked Media and hosted by organizer and activist DeRay Mckesson with weekly appearances by Samuel Sinyangwe, Clint Smith, and Brittany Packnett.

Mckesson talks about culture, social justice, and politics by exploring the history, language, and people who are shaping the struggle for progress — and talking about the steps that each of us can take to make a difference. When asked about the podcast's purpose, Mckessen said: "It is about creating space for conversation about the most important issues of the week. It is also about making sure people have the information they need to be the most thoughtful activists and organizers".

Notable guests have included Edward Snowden, Senator Cory Booker, and singers John Legend and Katy Perry.

Reception 

Pod Save the People debuted on the iTunes podcast chart at number four, and reached a peak of number two.

The A.V. Club noted that "For an audience increasingly hungry for quality discussion of deadly serious matters like health care, this show will likely be eagerly consumed".

See also 

 Political podcast

References

External links 
 

2017 podcast debuts
Political podcasts
Crooked Media
Audio podcasts
American podcasts
Liberal podcasts